The 1957 GP Ouest-France was the 21st edition of the GP Ouest-France cycle race and was held on 28 August 1957. The race started and finished in Plouay. The race was won by Isaac Vitré.

General classification

References

1957
1957 in road cycling
1957 in French sport